Will Thorp (born 21 June 1977) is an English actor.

Early life
Thorp attended St Augustine's Catholic College in Trowbridge. He studied at Bath College and joined Musical Youth Theatre Company. Thorp was also a member of the National Youth Theatre for 6 years before training at the Bristol Old Vic Theatre School for three years.

Career
Television credits includes; Stephen Poliakoff's "Friends and Crocodiles", Courtroom, Paul "Woody" Joiner in Casualty, Toby Zed in the 2006 series of Doctor Who in the episodes "The Impossible Planet" and "The Satan Pit". 2008, 'Hughie Green, Most Sincerely', Law and Order: UK, and in 2009 Thorp was cast as Chris Gray in Coronation Street. Other appearances include Scott & Bailey, Doctors, In The Club and "Unhallowed Ground" and Cornelius the Centurion in NBC's "A.D. The Bible Continues".
Theatre credits include: "Home Delivery" New Vic Basement, "Cork and Spark" New Vic Studio, "The Lost Dragon" Chester Gateway Theatre, "High Society" UK Tour, Don John & Dogberry in Much Ado About Nothing (2004), Teddy in Robbers and Sam (Sambo) in Fire Down Under! in 2002, In 2006 Thorp played the leading role in a national UK tour of the play Strangers on a Train. In 2008 he played the leading role in David Hare's play The Blue Room which opened at the Haymarket Theatre, Basingstoke. 2013 "Love and Money (play)" UK Tour.
In 2005 he appeared on the third series of the BBC's Strictly Come Dancing, reaching seventh place with his partner Hanna Haarala. He guest-starred in the Doctor Who audio play 100.

He has narrated a series of Doctor Who novels; Forever Autumn, Sick Building, Peacemaker and The Krillitane Storm, all produced by BBC Audiobooks. Other audiobooks read by Thorp include The Knife That Killed Me, Hyperpsychoreality Syndrome, Baboon, Buy-ology, The Kill Call, Click, Who Runs Britain? and The Spook's Curse, "The David Bowie Treasures", "Inverting the Pyramid", "Anatomy of England" and "The Dynamite Room".

Credits
Boys Will Be Boys (2003) .... Mark
Casualty (48 episodes, 2004–2005).... Paul "Woody" Joiner
The Courtroom (1 episode, 2004) .... PC David Wills
Holby City (1 episode, 2005) .... Woody Joiner
 Friends and Crocodiles (2005) (TV) .... Soup Man 2
Jodie (2005)
Doctor Who .... Toby Zed (2 episodes, 2006)
"The Impossible Planet"
"The Satan Pit"
Hughie Green, Most Sincerely (2008) (TV) .... TV Executive
Law & Order: UK (2009) (TV) .... Joe Buttler ( Series 2, Episode 3)
Coronation Street (2010–2011) (TV) .... Chris Gray
Scott & Bailey .... DS Miller (Series 2, Episode 8, 1 episode, 2012)
Doctors ....  Matt Davis (2013)
In The Club  .... Rosss Jackson (2014)
Unhallowed Ground (2015)
A.D. The Bible Continues .... Cornelius (2015)
Shakespeare & Hathaway (2018) .... Anton Dukes (Series 1, Episode 4)
All Creatures Great and Small (2021) …. Gerald Hamond (series 2 Episode 2)

References

External links

Watch: BBC webTV interview with Will Thorp – August 2006

1977 births
English male television actors
English male stage actors
Living people
People from Frome
Male actors from Somerset
National Youth Theatre members